Ann Hart Partridge is an American medical oncologist. She is the founder and director of the Young and Strong Program for Young Women with Breast Cancer at the Susan F. Smith Center for Women's Cancers at the Dana–Farber Cancer Institute.

Early life and education
Partridge was born in Manhasset, New York to a vascular surgeon father Henry. After her mother suffered a psychotic break, Henry raised her and her three siblings as a single father. Partridge said that her father was very influential in her, and her siblings' decision, to pursue a career in medicine. She attended Locust Valley High School where she played on their field hockey team alongside her sister Sheila and earned a placement at Georgetown University. While in college, Partridge was accepted into medical school early, allowing her to skip her MCATs and explore French as an Academic minor.

Partridge earned her medical degree at Weill Cornell Medicine and completed her internal medicine training at the Hospital of the University of Pennsylvania and Dana–Farber Cancer Institute. She also received a master's degree in public health from the Harvard T.H. Chan School of Public Health. During her residency, she was inspired by Edward Stadtmauer to pursue a career in clinical research after helping him in his bone marrow transplant experiments.

Career
Upon completing her residency, Partridge followed her husband to Boston and accepted a position at the Dana–Farber Cancer Institute under the guidance of Eric Winer. In 2005, she co-founded and directed Dana-Farber's Young and Strong Program for Young Women With Breast Cancer. She also contributed to the 2006 American Society of Clinical Oncology guideline on Fertility Preservation in Cancer Patients, which led to an increase in research on the subject. As a result of her success in breast cancer research, Partridge was appointed Clinical Director of the Susan F. Smith Center for Women's Cancers Breast Oncology Program and director of the Adult Survivorship Program. She was also named to Chair the Centers for Disease Control and Prevention's Advisory Committee on Breast Cancer in Young Women. Her efforts to end breast cancer were also recognized by the White House with one of the 2011 Champions of Change award.

While serving in the role of Director for Young Women with Breast Cancer and Adult Survivorship Program at Dana-Farber, Partridge received a $1.75 million, 5-year grant for the program to continue conducting research. She was recognized for her efforts in 2018 with the American Association for Cancer Research's Outstanding Investigator Award for Breast Cancer Research. The following year, Partridge was the recipient of the 2019 Ellen L. Stovall Award for Advancement of Cancer Survivorship Care.
She is currently the vice chair, medical oncology, and director of the Adult Survivorship Program at Dana-Farber Cancer Institute and Brigham and Women's Hospital and Professor of Medicine at Harvard Medical School.

Personal life
Partridge married Jon Mitchell in 1998 and they have three daughters together. Mitchell has served as the mayor of New Bedford, Massachusetts, since 2012.

References

Living people
Georgetown University alumni
Weill Cornell Medical College alumni
Harvard School of Public Health alumni
Harvard Medical School faculty
People from Manhasset, New York
American oncologists
Women oncologists
Year of birth missing (living people)